Milagros de Navidad (English: Christmas Miracles) is an American anthology television series that premiered on Telemundo on 27 November 2017, and concluded on 22 December 2017. The series is composed of independent chapters that have as a thread the conflicts that Latin immigrants live in the United States during the Christmas season.

The first season consists of 20 episodes and was broadcast from 27 November 2017 to 22 December 2017.

The first complete advance of the series was launched on Telemundo on November 23, 2017, during the broadcast of Macy's Thanksgiving Day Parade.

Overview 
Each episode presents stories of love, family, unity and hope, all developed during the Christmas season. Each chapter portrays its protagonists in situations that can be challenging, but always happiness, family unity, and faith will triumph thanks to a Christmas miracle.

Guest stars 
Many celebrities have guest starred in Milagros de Navidad season one. They include Alejandro Speitzer, Sonya Smith, Gabriel Valenzuela, Carmen Aub, Lambda García, Tony Garza, Ximena Duque, Héctor Soberón, Rodrigo de la Rosa, Gabriel Rossi, Lupita Ferrer, Ahrid Hannaley, Daniela Navarro, Mijail Mulkay, Wanda D'Isidoro, Litzy, Leo Deluglio, Jorge Luis Pila, Vanessa Villela, Paulo Quevedo, Flor Elena González, Gloria Peralta, Samadhi Zendejas, Eduardo Serrano, Laura Flores, Bobby Larios, Isabella Castillo, Natasha Domínguez, Ricardo Álamo, Gabriel Porras, Sabrina Seara, Javier Valcárcel, Elizabeth Gutiérrez, Alexandra Pomales, Sandra Destenave, Leonardo Daniel, Marisela González, Danny Pardo, Alicia Machado, Jesús Moré, Tina Romero, Gabo López, Ricardo Chávez, Rosalinda Serfaty, and Silvana Arias.

Episodes

Ratings 
 
}}

References

External links 
 

Telemundo original programming
Christmas television specials
2017 American television series debuts
Spanish-language television shows
Spanish-language television programming in the United States
2017 American television series endings